The Tonsil Hospital, which opened in 1921 and closed in 1946, was a Manhattan specialized hospital 
dedicated to just one task: "remove the tonsils and adenoids of poor children" when the need seemed to exist.

The hospital was in a four-story walkup building. As a hospital for the poor, pre-Medicaid, it was in need of funding from "society" donors, sponsorships, and other fundraisers.

The removal of tonsils, tonsillectomies, "was the single most common operation in the United States." Due to "the variability of available surgical techniques" this hospital's medical direcor, Robert Fowler, "undertook a quest for the 'better tonsil operation.'"

See also
 List of hospitals in Manhattan

References

Defunct hospitals in Manhattan